Kayke David Pereira (born on 22 January 2003), known as Kayke David, it is a Brazilian footballer who plays as a midfielder. He currently plays for Torpedo Kutaisi .

Club career
Kayke David began his career with Flamengo and made his professional debut for the club on 26 January 2022 against Portuguesa da Ilha. He came on as a 76th minute substitute for Igor Jesus as Flamengo win the match 2–1.

Career statistics

References

External links

2003 births
Living people
Brazilian footballers
Association football midfielders
Campeonato Brasileiro Série A players
CR Flamengo footballers